Unitxt is the fifth studio album by German electronic artist Alva Noto. It was released on July 22, 2008 via Raster-Noton label.

Background
The word "Unitxt" means the processing of rhythmic patterns (unit = unit of measurement, element) and information (txt = data, language). The album is the first installment in a trilogy, followed by 2011’s Univrs and 2018's Unieqav. Alva Noto initiated the Uni trilogy when he was booked to play live at the legendary club UNIT in Tokyo, so the project was started to adapt his music accordingly for the club's unique environment.

Reception
Dimitri Nasrallah of Exclaim! wrote "Unitxt, however, is a major leap forward from both Transform and the kind of glitch music that made headways at the turn of the century. Nicolai is working with more complex arrangements here and he appears more willing to let things get a bit messy, allowing sharp bursts of dissonance to enter the mix. Its fitting that nostalgia for the more serious techno of Mille Plateaux, Max Ernst and Raster-Noton has lately drifted back into the minimal mindsets of new acts like Shed and Stefan Goldmann, artists who find the current club culture a bit too formulaic and crowded to produce anything new. A release like Unitxt is a fitting and timely portrait of an uncompromising master at work".

Lukas Suveg of Tiny Mix Tapes stated "A curious dichotomy exists in Unitxt, the latest album from Carsten Nicolai, a.k.a. Alva Noto. Nicolai’s work relies on mathematical processes to govern rhythm (rather than traditional sequencers), utilizing machine noises — modems, telephones, and fax tones — for most of its sounds. On Unitxt, Alva Noto applies these frigid clicks and blips to an innate form of human expression: each track is about 120 bpm, and the rhythms, though often heavily obscured or syncopated, are entirely in 4/4 time — the basic ingredients for a dance album".

Track listing

Track 11 is unlisted.

Credits
Alva Noto – primary artist, composer, sounds
Anne-James Chaton – vocals

References

External links
Alva Noto official website

2008 albums
Alva Noto albums
Raster-Noton albums